Anthony Gargiulo (born November 20, 1984) is a former American professional Canadian football defensive end who played in the Canadian Football League (CFL). He played college football at Dartmouth.

Early life and high school
Gargiulo grew up in the Neshanic Station section of Branchburg, New Jersey and attended Immaculata High School in Somerville, New Jersey, where he played football and lacrosse. He was named first team All-Skyland Conference and second team All-State in football as a senior.

College career
Gargiulo was a member of the Dartmouth Big Green for four seasons. Gargiulo began to see significant playing time as a sophomore and was named honorable mention All-Ivy League after recording five sacks. He was named first team All-Ivy after leading the conference with twelve sacks and the team with 14 tackles for loss. Gargiulo was named first team All-Ivy again as a senior after recording 58 tackles, 21 tackles for a loss, and eight sacks with one fumble recovery and one forced fumble. Gargiulo finished his collegiate career with a school record 25 sacks.

After his senior season, Gargiulo joined the Dartmouth Rugby team and was a member of the club's 2006 Ivy Rugby Conference squad.

Professional career
Gargiulo was signed by the Calgary Stampeders of the Canadian Football League on Ma7 15, 2007. He finished his rookie season with 21 tackles, five sacks and one fumble recovery in 10 games played before breaking and tearing ligaments and tendons in his leg on an illegal block against the BC Lions on November 3, 2007. Gargiulo temporarily retired in 2008 due to his injury. He later returned from retirement and was signed to the Stampeders' practice roster on July 14, 2008. Gargiulo was released two weeks later on July 29, 2008.

References

External links
Dartmouth Big Green bio

1984 births
Living people
Canadian football defensive linemen
American players of Canadian football
American football defensive ends
Immaculata High School (New Jersey) alumni
People from Branchburg, New Jersey
Players of American football from New Jersey
Sportspeople from Somerset County, New Jersey
Calgary Stampeders players
Dartmouth Big Green football players